Panaetia, a genus in the Asteraceae (daisy) family, was first described by Henri Cassini in 1829 It is considered by Plants of the World Online and the Global Compositae Database to be a synonym of Podolepis Labil,.  while GBIF states it as "doubtful". However, in 2021, the Western Australian Herbarium accepted Jeffery Jeanes new circumscription of the genus, together with two species of Panaetia as being found in Western Australia: Panaetia lessonii, and Panaetia tepperi. Jeanes distinguished Panaetia from  the genera, Podolepis, Siemssenia and Walshia, using the following characters:
 the outer florets are all tubular; and
 the cypselas are minutely tuberculate and lack long finger-like papillae.

The genus is named for the stoic philosopher, Panaetius of Rhodes.

References

Asteraceae
Asteraceae genera